The Nashua Stakes is a Grade III American Thoroughbred horse race for two-year-olds over a distance of one mile on the main dirt track scheduled annually in late October or early November usually at Aqueduct Racetrack in Queens, New York. The event currently offers a purse of $150,000.

History
The event is named in honor of Nashua, the 1955 United States Horse of the Year. Nashua won the Dwyer Handicap at Aqueduct after he had just won the last two Classic events, the Preakness Stakes and Belmont Stakes.

The event was inaugurated on December 22, 1975, and was won by Lord Henribee, who was ridden by US Hall of Fame jockey Eddie Maple for his fourth straight win as the 2/5 odds-on favorite on a cold snowy day in a time of 1:35.

In 1982 the event was classified as Grade III and was upgraded to Grade II in 1986 for three runnings. The race returned to Grade II by the American Graded Stakes Committee in 2009 but was downgraded once more in 2018 back to Grade III.

The event was scheduled for the turf for three runnings between 1991 and 1993. The event has had several distance changes. The distance was set at a mile and 70 yards for 1985, at a mile and a sixteenth from 1987 to 1993 and six furlongs in 2011. The event was not held in 1995 and  has been held at Belmont Park four times, the last of which was in 2021.

The event is late in the season and it is usually a good race for late-developing two-year-olds. There have been several notable participants who have made an impact later in their racing careers. The 1991 winner Pine Bluff went on to win the 1992 Preakness Stakes while the 1997 winner Coronado's Quest the following year won the Grade I Haskell Invitational and Grade I Travers Stakes. In 2010 To Honor and Serve led all the way to record an easy 4-length victory over Mucho Macho Man. To Honor and Serve also won two Grade Is later in his career, the Cigar Mile Handicap and Woodward Stakes while Mucho Macho Man won the Breeders' Cup Classic in 2013 as a five-year-old.

Records
Time record:  
1 mile: 1:34:66  – Independence Hall (2019)
 miles: 1:44.60 – Dalhart (1992)

Margins:
 lengths - Quadratic (1977)
 lengths - Independence Hall (2019)

Most wins by an owner
 3 – Loblolly Stable (1988, 1991, 1992)

Most wins by a jockey
 4 – Jerry D. Bailey (1990, 1998, 2001, 2003)

Most wins by a trainer
 5 – Kiaran McLaughlin (2006, 2007, 2013, 2015, 2017)

Winners

Legend:

 
 

Notes:

§ Ran as an entry

† In the 1980 running, Willow Hour was first past the post, but was disqualified and placed last for interference in the running of the race.

See also
List of American and Canadian Graded races

References

1975 establishments in New York City
Horse races in New York City
Aqueduct Racetrack
Flat horse races for two-year-olds
Graded stakes races in the United States
Grade 3 stakes races in the United States
Recurring sporting events established in 1975